Goodnight Mister Tom is a children's novel by English author Michelle Magorian, published by Kestrel in 1981. Harper & Row published an American edition the same year. Set during World War II, it features a boy abused at home in London who is evacuated to the country at the outbreak of the war. In the care of Mister Tom, an elderly recluse, he experiences a new life of loving and care.

Magorian and Mister Tom won the annual once-or-lifetime Guardian Children's Fiction Prize, judged by a panel of British children's writers. She was also a commended runner-up for the Carnegie Medal from the British librarians, recognising the year's best English-language children's book published in the UK.

The novel has been adapted as a stage musical and as the film Goodnight Mister Tom (1998). In 2003, it was listed at #49 on the BBC's survey The Big Read. The most recent theatrical adaptation, Goodnight Mister Tom, won the Laurence Olivier Award for Best Entertainment.

Plot
In September 1939, as Britain stands on the brink of the war, many young children from the cities are evacuated to the countryside to escape imminent German bombardment. William Beech, a boy from Deptford who is physically and emotionally abused by his mother, arrives at the village of Little Weirwold. Willie is timid, thin, and covered with bruises and sores. He also believes he is full of sin, thanks to his strict, religious, and mentally unstable mother. He wets the bed every day.

Tom Oakley, or "Mister Tom" as William calls him, is a reclusive and ill-tempered widower in his sixties. He is avoided by the community and vice versa. William's mother wanted William to live with someone who was either religious or lived near a church, and Tom takes in Willie. Though initially distant, Tom is moved after discovering William's home life and treats him with kindness. William grows attached to Tom and his dog, Sammy.

William attends school and makes friends, including George, twins Carrie and Ginnie, and especially fellow evacuee Zach. William learns to read and write with the help of Tom and others, and shows talent in drawing, painting, and dramatics. As William is changed by Tom, so is Tom transformed by William. It is revealed that Tom lost his wife and baby son to scarletina forty years ago.

William's mother writes that she is sick and requests that William return to her. At first, William looks forward to helping his mother and showing her his accomplishments. However, she is annoyed to hear about his time away, as he has not been learning the Bible by rote and has been receiving gifts and attention from others. She shows him her newborn girl, who is lying neglected in a box. Furious to hear about his association with the Jewish Zach and to see William speak for himself, she accuses him of blasphemy and knocks him unconscious. William regains consciousness to find himself in the cupboard under the stairs, stripped down to his underwear, with his ankle twisted. He quietly sobs for Tom before falling asleep.

Weeks after William's departure, Tom feels something is not right, as William has not written. Although he has never travelled far, he takes the train into London and eventually finds Deptford and William's home. The house appears to be empty, but Sammy is agitated by something inside. Tom persuades a local policeman to break down the door. They find William locked to a pipe in the closet with the baby, who has died. William is malnourished and badly bruised as he had been locked there for days. William is hospitalised. Whilst there, he suffers horrific nightmares and is drugged to prevent his screams from disturbing other children's sleep. Tom hears that William will be taken to a children's home. He kidnaps William from the hospital and takes him back to Little Weirwold.

William remains bedridden and traumatised by his ordeal. He blames himself for the death of his sister, as he was not able to give her enough milk. Zach visits him daily. William grows stronger and visits his favourite teacher, Annie Hartridge. From Annie and Zach, William learns that he could not have fed a baby on his own and that a woman cannot conceive a child on her own. He realises his mother had sex with a man, though she told him that it was a sin for unmarried men and women to consort. He no longer blames himself for his sister's death.

The authorities arrive from London to tell William that his mother has committed suicide. They want to take him to a children's home, as he has no other relatives. Tom intervenes and is allowed to adopt William. Tom, William, and Zach enjoy a holiday at the seaside village of Salmouth, where the landlady of their cottage mistake William as Tom's son. Zach receives news that his father has been injured by German bombing. Zach hurries back to London by train. Not long later, Zach dies in The Blitz. William is grief-stricken.

William heals through his friendship with another recluse, Geoffrey Sanderton, a young man who lost a leg during the war and gives William private art lessons. After Geoffrey shares a photo of his own best friend, who is also dead, William begins to come to terms with Zach's death. Using Zach's bike, William teaches himself to ride. He realises that Zach will always be a part of him. William also grows closer to Carrie as they bond over Zach's memories. 

One night, on returning home to Tom, whom he now calls "Dad", William thinks back on how much he has changed since arriving in Little Weirwold and realises he is growing up.

Awards
 Commended, The Carnegie Medal 1981
 The Guardian Fiction Award 1982
 International Reading Association Award 1982
 Runner-up for The Young Observer Prize 1982
 Western Australian Young Readers Book Award 1982

Notes

References

External links
  —immediately, first US edition
 

British children's novels
Novels set during World War II
Guardian Children's Fiction Prize-winning works
1981 British novels
British novels adapted into television shows
British novels adapted into films
British novels adapted into plays
1981 children's books
1981 debut novels